Star Paws is a video game for the Commodore 64, Amstrad CPC, and the ZX Spectrum. This video game was released by Software Projects in 1987.

Gameplay
The game's plot involved captain Rover Pawstrong (a dog in a space suit) in his adventures on a planet, attempting to capture 20 Space Griffins (essentially large, fast chickens). Gameplay involves the player's character running back and forth on a side-scrolling planet surface, attempting to catch the Griffins. The player finds crates which contain items that the player can use to help catch the bird - or the player can simply try and run and jump on top of the bird, thus catching it. During playtime, there is a time limit by which a bird must be caught (indicated by a roast chicken slowly turning into chicken bones), or else the game ends. At later stages in the game, the player must navigate abandoned mines, where the Griffins may be hiding, and even use a mortar to shell Griffins as they move across a landscape.

Development
The game is subject to an urban myth that the unreleased game, Attack of the Mutant Zombie Flesh Eating Chickens From Mars written by Matthew Smith, was adapted to become Star Paws. The only thing that the games have in common is that they were independently developed as games based on the Wile E. Coyote and the Road Runner franchise. When Software Projects failed to get the official license, John Darnell's game was adapted to become Star Paws, while Matthew Smith's game wasn't developed any further. The developer Software Projects went out of business one year later.

References

1987 video games
Action video games
Amstrad CPC games
Commodore 64 games
Video games about dogs
Video games scored by Rob Hubbard
Video games scored by Tim Follin
Video games developed in the United Kingdom
Video games set on fictional planets
ZX Spectrum games
Software Projects games
Single-player video games